Murik a.k.a. Nor is a Lower Sepik language spoken in Papua New Guinea. It is spoken in Murik ward of Marienberg Rural LLG, East Sepik Province, which is located around a large coastal lagoon.

Phonology
Murik consonants are:
{| 
| p || t ||  || k
|-
| b || d || ʤ || ɡ
|-
| ᵐb || ⁿd || ᶮʤ || ᵑg
|-
| m || n || ɲ || ŋ
|-
|  || s ||  || 
|-
|  || r ||  || 
|-
| w ||  || j || 
|}

Pronouns
Murik independent pronouns are:

{| 
!  !! singular !! dual !! paucal !! plural
|-
! 1
| ma || ga-i || ag-i || e<*a+i
|-
! 2
| mi || ga-u || ag-u || o<*a+u
|-
! 3
| mən || məndəb || məŋgə || mwa
|}

Nouns
Murik nouns are inflected for four numbers.

{| 
!  !! ‘person’ !! ‘house’
|-
! singular
| nor || iran
|-
! dual
| normbo || irambo
|-
! paucal
| norgə || iramoara
|-
! plural
| normot || iranmot
|}

References

Languages of East Sepik Province
Lower Sepik languages
Vulnerable languages